Emmanuel Joseph Raphaël Orazi, known as Manuel Orazi, was an art nouveau illustrator, poster artist, and jewelry designer, as well as a set creator for theater and film. 

He was born probably in Rome in 1860 and died in Paris in 1934.

Notable Works

In 1895 he created the  Calendrier Magique, an occult-themed calendar still noted for its graphic design. 

Limiting it to 777 copies, he collaborated with popular French author ,    who wrote the text.  

Sympathetic to the French Decadent movement, as well as Symbolism and Aestheticism, he also illustrated novels such as Aphrodite by Pierre Louÿs, Ma petite ville by Jean Lorrain in 1898 and Les Fleurs du mal by Baudelaire. 

Orazi illustrated an early Art Deco French edition of the 1891 one-act play by Oscar Wilde, Salome.

He made jewelry designs that were displayed at Maison de l'Art Nouveau in 1896. In 1899 he designed some of the first pieces of jewelry for the Maison Arnould. His jewelry designs were also sold at La Maison Moderne. Orazi designed one of the best known posters for La Maison Moderne.

For her theater at the Universal Exposition in Paris in 1900, Loie Fuller commissioned Orazi to create the poster, which was printed in three editions and three color schemes.

In 1921 he designed the sets for the silent film L'Atlantide.

References

External links
https://www.moma.org/collection/works/8984

19th-century Italian painters
Italian male painters
20th-century Italian painters
Italian illustrators
Italian scenic designers
Italian poster artists
1860 births
1934 deaths
Art Nouveau illustrators
Art Nouveau designers
Painters from Rome
19th-century Italian male artists
20th-century Italian male artists